The New York Inter–Giuliana was a soccer team based in New York City.

History

The club was National Challenge Cup's runner-up in 1975 and 1976. They also participated on CONCACAF Champions' Cup in 1976 and withdrew in 1977.

Honors
National Challenge Cup
Runner-up (1): 1975, 1976

References

Defunct soccer clubs in New York (state)